Cumbria Motors was a British cyclecar manufacturer based in Cockermouth (Cumberland) in 1914.

The Cumbria 8/10 hp Cyclecar had a V-twin engine of 964 cc or 995 cc and the wheelbase was 2,286 mm.
The Cumbria 10/12 hp cyclecar had a four-cylinder engine of 1,110 cc and the wheelbase was 2,438 mm.

Model

See also
 List of car manufacturers of the United Kingdom

References

Other sources 
 Harald Linz und Halwart Schrader: Die Internationale Automobil-Enzyklopädie. United Soft Media Verlag GmbH, München 2008, 
 Nick Georgano: The Beaulieu Encyclopedia of the Automobile, Volume 1 A–F. Fitzroy Dearborn Publishers, Chicago 2001,  (englisch)
 David Culshaw & Peter Horrobin: The Complete Catalogue of British Cars 1895–1975. Veloce Publishing plc. Dorchester (1999). 

Cyclecars
Defunct motor vehicle manufacturers of England
Motor vehicle manufacturers of England
Companies based in Cumbria
Cars introduced in 1914
Vehicle manufacturing companies established in 1914
1914 establishments in England
British companies established in 1914